Jacob Svetoslav (Yakov Svetoslav) (ca. 1210s/1220s–1275 or 1276/1277) was a prominent 13th-century Bulgarian noble (bolyarin) of Rus' origin. Bestowed the title of despot, Jacob Svetoslav was the ruler of a widely autonomous domain of the Second Bulgarian Empire most likely located around Sofia. Seeking further independence and claiming the title of Emperor of Bulgaria, he twice changed allegiance from Bulgaria to the Kingdom of Hungary and vice versa, and the Hungarians recognized his Bulgarian royal rank as their vassal and ruler of Vidin (medieval Bdin).

Bulgarian despot
Jacob Svetoslav's exact origin is not clear, though he is known to have been distant descendant of East Slavic noble. Historian Plamen Pavlov theorizes that Jacob Svetoslav was a descendant of the princes (knyaze) of Kievan Rus', and estimates his birth date as being in the 1210s or 1220s. In the late 1250s, Jacob Svetoslav was already an influential noble. He married a daughter of Theodore II Laskaris from his marriage with Tsar Ivan Asen II's daughter Elena. By 1261, he had become a despot, a high-ranking noble in the Bulgarian hierarchy. The title was awarded to him probably by his own suzerain, the ruler of Bulgaria, rather than a Byzantine emperor, possibly Constantine Tih. Jacob Svetoslav was close to the Bulgarian court and pledged loyalty to Constantine. Thus, the tsar made him the ruler of a domain usually considered to have been south of the Vidin region in the west of the Bulgarian Empire. Byzantine sources indicate his possessions lay "near Haemus", thus close to Sofia, between the Hungarian possessions to the north and Macedonia to the south.

In 1261, he commanded the Bulgarian forces in a war against Hungary near Severin (western Wallachia), and in 1262 he possibly fought against Byzantium, as a Byzantine army invaded his lands in the following year during an anti-Bulgarian campaign. Jacob requested the making of a copy of the Nomocanon which was then sent to Cyril III, the Metropolitan of Kiev. It was supplemented by a letter from Jacob in which the noble calls the metropolitan "the bishop of the entire Russ land... of my ancestors". The copy finishes with a passage in which Jacob is called a "Bulgarian despot". He also minted his own coins bearing the imperfect images of Saint Demetrius of Thessaloniki or Jacob himself, dressed as a warrior wearing a helmet and holding a sword.

Hungarian and Bulgarian ruler of Vidin

In 1263, the situation in Bulgaria was far from stable, as Constantine was facing both the threat of his predecessor Mitso Asen's throne ambitions and a large-scale Byzantine invasion. Because Constantine was unable to assist Jacob against the advancing Byzantines, Jacob sought aid from his northern neighbour, Hungarian king Stephen V. The Hungarians drove the Byzantines out of Jacob's domain and themselves invaded Byzantine-controlled territories. Rescued from the Byzantine threat, Jacob Svetoslav submitted to Hungarian suzerainty. Stephen V placed him as the ruler of the Vidin province on the Danube River, previously governed for Hungary by the then-deceased Rostislav Mikhailovich, and allowed him to retain his lands to the south. Had it not been for the appointment of Jacob Svetoslav as a Hungarian vassal at Vidin, Bulgaria would have re-established control over the city in 1263.

In 1264, however, Hungary was precipitated into another civil war between Stephen V and his father Béla IV. Fearing Bulgarian retribution and lack of Hungarian support should Béla IV come out victorious, in 1265 Jacob Svetoslav changed allegiance to Bulgaria and acknowledged the authority of Constantine Tih. The two crossed the Danube in 1265 and raided the Hungarian fortresses north of the river. By the spring of 1266, however, Stephen V had established himself as the sole ruler of Hungary, and on 23 June 1266, conquered Vidin back from Jacob after a brief siege. Two waves of Hungarian raids proceeded to devastate the Vidin province and enter the possessions of Constantine. In spite of Bulgarian resistance, the Hungarians subjugated a number of cities including Pleven. Jacob Svetoslav's previous defection to Bulgarian suzerainty notwithstanding, the Hungarians restored him as the puppet ruler of the Vidin region. In 1266, he was even referred to as "Tsar of the Bulgarians" (imperator Bulgarorum) in Hungarian sources, possibly to encourage a rivalry between Constantine and Jacob Svetoslav for the Bulgarian throne or simply to satisfy Jacob's ambitions.

Final submission to Bulgaria and death
The death of Stephen V in 1272 meant that he was succeeded by his infant son Ladislaus IV, with the widowed consort and mother of the boy, Elizabeth, as his regent. At the time, Jacob Svetoslav still held Vidin as a Hungarian vassal. Possibly in 1273, Hungarian rule in Braničevo, west of Jacob's domain, was put to an end by two Bulgarian nobles, Darman and Kudelin. Cut off from his Hungarian suzerains and facing the menace of a Bulgarian attack from the east, Jacob Svetoslav once again submitted to Bulgarian rule. He arrived in the capital Tarnovo to negotiate his submission with Constantine's consort Maria Palaiologina Kantakouzene, who was the dominant figure in the empire at the time due to the Tsar's paralysis. There, Jacob was formally adopted by the much younger Maria as her second son, after the infant heir Michael Asen II. This adoption solidified Jacob's ties to the court and meant that he could safely retain his autonomous domain as a Bulgarian vassal. He also harboured hopes to ascend to the throne by ousting Michael when Constantine died. Suspicious of these disloyal intentions of Jacob's, Constantine's consort Maria is thought to have poisoned him, and he died in 1275 or 1276/1777, shortly before the Uprising of Ivaylo.

While the fate of the city of Vidin itself is unclear, at least part of Jacob's possessions were certainly restored to direct Bulgarian rule in the wake of his death. One such territory was the Svrljig region lying southwest of Vidin, which in 1278 was documented as belonging to Bulgaria.

References

Sources
 
 
 
 
 

People from Vidin
Medieval Bulgarian nobility
Medieval Hungarian nobility
13th-century Bulgarian people
13th-century princes in Kievan Rus'
Bulgarian people of Russian descent
Medieval Bulgarian military personnel
Year of birth unknown
1270s deaths
13th-century births
Eastern Orthodox monarchs
Despots of the Second Bulgarian Empire